Alberto San Juan Guijarro (born 1 November 1968) is a Spanish film, stage  and television actor.

Biography 
Alberto San Juan was born on 1 November 1968 in Madrid, son to cartoonist  and radio announcer Pilar Guijarro Ortiz de Zárate. He spent many of his childhood's summers in Cañamares, province of Cuenca. He studied journalism and worked for two years at Diario 16 before pursuing an acting career. At age 24, he joined the Cristina Rota's atelier to train his acting chops. Jointly with Guillermo Toledo, Nathalie Poza and Ernesto Alterio, San Juan founded the theatre group 'Ración de oreja', which merged with Andrés Lima's 'Riesgo' into the theatre company .

Filmography

Film

Accolades

References

External links 

Living people
1968 births
Male actors from Madrid
Spanish male film actors
Spanish male stage actors
Spanish male television actors
Best Actor Goya Award winners
Best Supporting Actor Goya Award winners
20th-century Spanish male actors
21st-century Spanish male actors